Platform is a London-based post-production company established in 2001. Starting out as an editing house for children and sports programmes, the Soho-based facility now covers a variety of long-form and short-form projects in broadcast and advertising with its services offering audio, online editing, grading, visual effects and graphics.

The creative team at Platform is currently led by managing director Jo Beighton, recently appointed in the summer of 2017 after a period of consultancy, partner and online editor Simon Cruse and partner and lead VFX artist John Cryer, all sharing a third of the company.

History
At the time of its establishment Platform was founded in 2001 by creative director and graphic designer David Tasker and editor Simon Cruse. Occupying the top 2 floors of no.6 D'Arblay Street in Soho and working with their personal existing client base, Platform established itself as the go to post house for sports programming, with Matchroom being their first client, as well as for children's programming.  Platform has hosted numerous children shows such as Art Attack, Chucklevision, SMart,  Thomas and Friends,  It's a Mystery, and Horrible Histories and by 2005 Platform was the largest supplier of post-production to the BBC children's department with approximately 25% of their output being finished at the facility. The first programme edited in the building was ‘Freestyle’ for the BBC.

In 2008 VFX editor and colourist John Cryer from The Joint joined Platform investing a share of the company and contributing high-end visual effects to Platform's creative offering. This kick started Platform's commercial presence, diversifying the company's client base and ensured the company's ability to take on graphic and VFX heavy projects.

Platform has undergone expansion of the facility in Soho in order to broaden its range of genres, which has seen it grow from a three suite outfit into a creative hub of twenty-four operational area offering 12 Avid suites, 3 studios, 4 flames suites and a grading suites with Baselight.

References

Film production companies of the United Kingdom